Normand Marinacci is a Canadian politician, who currently serves on Montreal City Council as the borough mayor of L'Île-Bizard–Sainte-Geneviève and as Agglomeration council member.

First elected in the 2013 municipal election as a member of Mélanie Joly's Vrai changement pour Montréal party, he switched his affiliation to Projet Montréal in June 2017.

References

Living people
Montreal city councillors
Canadian people of Italian descent
Mayors of places in Quebec
Year of birth missing (living people)